Paul Flanagan (born 16 September 1992) is an Irish hurler who plays as a right corner-back for the Clare senior team.

Born in Ballyea, County Clare, Flanagan first played competitive hurling whilst at school in St. Flannan's College. He arrived on the inter-county scene at the age of seventeen when he first linked up with the Clare minor team, before later lining out with the under-21 side. He joined the senior team in the 2013 championship. However, he has yet to make his debut at this level.

At club level Flanagan plays hurling with Ballyea and Gaelic football with Clondegad.

References

1992 births
Living people
Ballyea hurlers
Clondegad Gaelic footballers
Clare inter-county hurlers